Gennaro Ruggiero (born 4 February 2000) is an Italian footballer, currently unattached.

Career
A physical central midfielder, and a product of Naples-based renowned youth team Mariano Keller, he was spotted by Palermo scouts and then signed in 2014.

He made his Serie A debut at the age of 17 on 14 May 2017, playing the entirety of a home league game against Genoa, and becoming the third footballer born from the year 2000 to play in the Italian top flight (after Moise Kean and Pietro Pellegri).

He was successively loaned out to Torino for the 2017–18 season, but failed to make any first team appearance during the season and appeared only for the Granata's U-19 team before returning to Palermo, again as part of the Under-19 team.

After a lone season with Serie B club Livorno, he was signed by Serie D club Nola as a free transfer in November 2020. On 7 August 2021, he moved to San Giorgio, another Serie D club from his native region of Campania. He was released by the end of the season, after San Giorgio folded following their relegation to Eccellenza.

References

2000 births
Footballers from Naples
Living people
Palermo F.C. players
U.S. Livorno 1915 players
Italian footballers
Serie A players
Serie B players
Association football midfielders